Le Défenseur du Temps (The Defender of Time) is a large mechanical work of art in the form of a clock created by the French artist Jacques Monestier.

Description
Le Défenseur du Temps is a clock made of automata. Close to the dial, a man perched on a rock with a sword and shield fights against a bird, a dragon, and a crab which respectively represent air, earth, and water. As originally designed, every hour from 9 am to 10 pm, he fights one of the three animals chosen randomly by a program. At noon, 6 pm, and 10pm, all three animals attack at the same time.

The time is announced by three strokes. While the man fights, he is accompanied by sounds of breaking waves, rumbling earth or the sound of wind, depending on the animal chosen.

Le Défenseur du temps is 4 meters high and weighs about 1 ton. The characters, animals and the clock face are hammered brass and gold leaf. The rock on which they sit is composed of oxidized brass. In its original configuration, a master electronic quartz circuit board controlled the random attacks chance, and used six cam timers and five tape recorders.

Location

Le Défenseur du temps is located at 8 rue Bernard de Clairvaux, in the Quartier de l'Horloge in Paris' 3rd arrondissement. The area around the clock owes its name to this work.

History

Le Défenseur du temps was commissioned in 1975 by COGEDIM. The scales of the dragon were made by Louis Desouches, and the construction of the steel structure was by Alain Moirod.

The clock was partially installed in September 1979. It was formally dedicated on 8 October 1979 by the Mayor of Paris, Jacques Chirac.

The clock underwent restoration in 1995. The master clock's quartz crystal was replaced by a radio clock, and the tape recorders were replaced by a compact disc player. Without funding for maintenance, the clock has been stopped since July 1, 2003.

In February 2022, the clock was taken down and the restoration of the clock has begun to take place. The Defenseur Du Temps should be fixed and reinstalled by March 2023.

External links
 Conception et réalisation du "Défenseur du Temps"
 Le Defenseur du Temps clock

References

Buildings and structures in the 3rd arrondissement of Paris
Tourist attractions in Paris
Clocks in France